The Rhône culture was an archaeological culture of the Early Bronze Age (ca. 2200-1500 BC) located in eastern France and western Switzerland, centred along the Rhône river. The culture developed from the local Bell Beaker culture, possibly with further migrations from central Europe. According to Sergent (1995) the Rhône culture represents a southern variant of the Unetice culture. Rhône culture metalwork and pottery are particularly similar to those of the Straubing group in Bavaria.

The Thun-Renzenbühl axe (c. 1800 BC), found near Thun and attributed to the Rhône culture, is one of the earliest examples of damascening technique in the world. The gold inlay decoration on the axe may also have a numerical, astronomical meaning.

Gallery

See also 
 Unetice culture
 Bronze Age Britain
 Armorican Tumulus culture
 Polada culture
 Ottomány culture
 Wietenberg culture
 Tumulus culture
 Nordic Bronze Age

References 

Archaeological cultures of Central Europe
Bronze Age cultures of Europe
Archaeological cultures in France
Bronze Age France